Karlovice may refer to places in the Czech Republic:

Karlovice (Bruntál District), a municipality and village in the Moravian-Silesian Region
Karlovice (Semily District), a municipality and village in the Liberec Region
Karlovice (Zlín District), a municipality and village in the Zlín Region